Thomas F. Patton may refer to:

 Tom Patton (born 1953), member of the Ohio House of Representatives
 Thomas F. Patton (executive) (1903–2001), president, chairman and chief executive officer of Republic Steel